Ludwig von Herterich (13 October 1856, Ansbach - 25 December 1932, Etzenhausen, today in Dachau) was a German painter and art teacher.  He is best known as a painter of portraits and history paintings and is a representative of the Munich School.

Biography 
He was the son of a sculptor and art restorer, Franz Herterich, and the younger brother of painter Johann Caspar Herterich.  He taught at the Kunstschule Stuttgart and then from 1898 as a professor at the Academy of Fine Arts Munich.  His pupils included Karl Caspar, Maria Caspar-Filser, Adolf Erbslöh, David Karfunkle, Käthe Kollwitz, Hermann Mühlen (1886-1964), Julius Seyler, Maria Slavona, and Anton Zilzer.  For his services to art, he was awarded the Order of Maximilian in 1908 and made a life peer.

Herterich was heavily involved along with others in producing the pictorial art for Schloss Wolfsbrunn in the Ore Mountains.

Notes

External links 

1932 deaths
19th-century German painters
19th-century German male artists
German male painters
20th-century German painters
20th-century German male artists
1856 births
Academic staff of the Academy of Fine Arts, Munich
19th-century painters of historical subjects